Stenstorp is a locality situated in Falköping Municipality, Västra Götaland County, Sweden. It had 1,668 inhabitants in 2010.

Railways 
The Western Main Line runs through Stenstorp and regional passenger trains from Gothenburg and Jönköping stop there. The travel time to the two closest cities, Falköping in the south and Skövde to the north, is about 10 minutes each. Between the 1870s and the 1960s, Stenstorp was a railway junction, as two 891 mm narrow gauge railways to Lidköping (westward) and Hjo (eastward) met there and connected to the state-owned Western Main Line.

References 

Populated places in Västra Götaland County
Populated places in Falköping Municipality